Julia Williams, is a British nurse and paramedic who is a professor for paramedic science at the University of Hertfordshire.  She is a member of the editorial board for the British Paramedic Journal and a member of the College of Paramedics Research and Audit Group.  Williams is also a member of the 999 EMS Research Forum Board. The 999 EMS Research Forum is a UK-based partnership that brings together academics and health care providers with a research interest in emergency care. She has also supervised a number of paramedic PhD candidates.

University of Hertfordshire

Williams is employed by the University of Hertfordshire as Research Lead and Associate Dean of School in the School of Health and Social Work.  Her area of speciality is primarily research methodology and qualitative data analysis when applied to out-of-hospital care research. She is also Adjunct Professor in Clinical Science, Queensland University of Technology. She was a Principal Lecturer and Research Lead for Paramedic Science. In March 2013, she was appointed as a Professor.

Williams has an interest in: qualitative research methods; ethnography and computer-assisted qualitative data analysis software (CAQDAS).

She was awarded a PhD in 2006 from King's College London and elected as a Fellow of the College of Paramedics in 2017.

Publications

2011-present

Dietary Advice and Collaborative Working: Do Pharmacists and Allied Health Professionals Other Than Dietitians Have a Role? McClinchy, J., Williams, J., Gordon, L. & Cairns, M. C. 12 Feb 2015 In Healthcare. 3, 1, p. 64-77 14 p.

The use of videos in blended learning to enhance students' learning in systems-based patient assessment with development of associated clinical skills: an analysis. Hitch, G., Williams, J., Herbland, A., Bowen, J., Jardine, S. A., Power, P. & Venstone, G. 2014 In Pharmacy Education.

Does Use of the Recognition Of Stroke In the Emergency Room stroke assessment tool enhance stroke recognition by ambulance clinicians. Fothergill, R., Williams, J., Edwards, M., Russell, I. & Gompertz, P. Nov 2013 In Stroke. 44, 11, p. 3007-3012.

2000-2010

Publications investigating the effect of gender on the management of pain, and also new frontiers in CPR.

Chest auscultation: is it as simple as it sounds? Journal of Paramedic Practice 1(11): 471 - 472 (Aug 2009). 

Is it curtains for Nellie? Journal of Paramedic Practice 1(15): 643 - 644 (Dec 2009).

Simulation: is it a child's play? Julia Williams, Mark Small, John Donaghy, Tony Brooks
Journal of Paramedic Practice 1(10): 435 - 436 (Jul 2009).

What are the highest priorities for research in pre-hospital care? Results of a review and Delphi consultation exercise.

Developing a new response to non-urgent emergency calls: evaluation of a nurse and paramedic partnership intervention.

Paramedics and nurses in partnership: perceptions of a new response to low-priority ambulance calls.

Prof Williams' work explored the experiences of homeless people in relation to health and healthcare.

References

External links
 profile at University of Hertfordshire

Living people
Academics of the University of Hertfordshire
Year of birth missing (living people)